This article contains lists of Palestinian suicide attacks carried out by Palestinian individuals and militant groups, usually against Israeli civilian targets. The use of indiscriminate attacks on civilian populations is illegal under international law.

The first suicide attack was carried out in 1989 and the attacks steeply declined by 2008. The high point was in 2002 during the Second Intifada. A 2007 study of Palestinian suicide bombings during the Second Intifada (September 2000 through August 2005) found that 39.9 percent of the suicide attacks were carried out by Hamas, 26.4 percent by Fatah, 25.7 percent by the Palestinian Islamic Jihad (PIJ), 5.4 percent by the Popular Front for the Liberation of Palestine (PFLP) and 2.7 percent by other organizations.

The Simon Wiesenthal Center has advocated classifying suicide bombings as crimes against humanity, a position adopted by Amnesty International and Human Rights Watch in 2002.

The criteria used for this list: successful deliberate attacks committed by Palestinian militant groups against either civilians or security forces, in which the perpetrators intended to die during the attack.

Bold indicates attacks resulting in over 10 deaths.
Bold Underscored indicates attacks resulting in over 20 deaths.
The perpetrator(s) are not included in the death tolls noted in this list.

1980s

1989 (1 attack)

1990s

1993 (2 bombings)

1994 (5 bombings)

1995 (4 bombings)

1996 (4 bombings)

1997 (3 bombings)

1998 (2 bombings)

1999 (2 bombings)

2000s
The Al-Aqsa Intifada saw a dramatic upswing in suicide bombings, with A, 40% of the total number originated in East Jerusalem.

2000 (5 bombings)

2001 (40 bombings)

2002 (47 bombings)

2003 (23 bombings)

2004 (17 bombings)

2005 (9 bombings)

2006 (3 bombings)

2007 (1 bombing)

2008 (2 bombings)

2010s

2015 (1 bombing)

2016 (1 bombing)

Total number of injuries and fatalities, by year
Note: statistics are taken from lists above.

See also

Lists of Palestinian rocket attacks on Israel
List of attacks on non-combatants in the Second Intifada
Civilian casualties in the Second Intifada
Violence in the Israeli–Palestinian conflict 2000
Violence in the Israeli–Palestinian conflict 2001
Violence in the Israeli–Palestinian conflict 2002
Violence in the Israeli–Palestinian conflict 2003
Violence in the Israeli–Palestinian conflict 2004
Violence in the Israeli–Palestinian conflict 2005
Violence in the Israeli–Palestinian conflict 2006
Violence in the Israeli–Palestinian conflict 2007
Violence in the Israeli–Palestinian conflict 2008
Israeli West Bank barrier
Israeli casualties of war
Palestinian political violence
 First Intifada (1987-1993)
 Second Intifada (2000-2005)
 Silent Intifada (2014)
 Israeli–Palestinian conflict (2015)
 Sumud (steadfastness)

Sources and external links
Israeli Ministry of Foreign Affairs
Johnston's Terrorism Archive
Jewish Virtual Library Fatal terrorist attacks in Israel since the Declaration of Principles
Palestinian Suicide Bombers: A Statistical Analysis
Willing to Die: Palestinian suicide bombers, TruTV

Notes

Citations

Sources

Palestinian suicide attacks
Terrorist attacks attributed to Palestinian militant groups
Palestinian suicide attacks
suicide attacks
suicide